Buckinghamshire Constabulary was the Home Office police force for the county of Buckinghamshire, England, until 1968. 

Buckinghamshire Constabulary was established 6 February 1857. At establishment it had a strength of 102 officers.  In 1868, prior to a national police pay structure, a newly recruited constable had a weekly net wage of 14s 1d which was 3 shillings a week less than constables in Staffordshire. 

It later absorbed Buckingham Borough Police 1 April 1889 and Chepping Wycombe Borough Police on 1 April 1947. In 1965, it had an establishment of 738 and an actual strength of 672.

On 1 April 1968, Thames Valley Constabulary was formed by the amalgamation of Buckinghamshire Constabulary, Berkshire Constabulary, Oxford City Police, Oxfordshire Constabulary and Reading Borough Police.  At the point of amalgamation the constabulary had a strength of 1,042 police officers.

Chief Constables
Chief Constables were: 
1857–1867 : Captain Willoughby Harcourt Carter 
1867–1896 : Captain John Charles Tyrwhitt-Drake 
1896–1928 : Major Otway Mayne 
1928–1953 : Colonel Sir Thomas Richard Pennefather Warren, 8th Baronet, CBE
1953–1968 : Brigadier John Cheney

See also
List of defunct law enforcement agencies in the United Kingdom

Footnotes

References
A pre-history of Thames Valley Police

Defunct police forces of England
Constabulary
Constabulary
Government agencies established in 1857
1968 disestablishments in England
1857 establishments in England